The 1993 Newsweek Champions Cup and the Matrix Essentials Evert Cup were tennis tournaments played on outdoor hard courts. It was the 20th edition of the tournament, and was part of the ATP Super 9 of the 1993 ATP Tour and of the WTA Tier II Series of the 1993 WTA Tour. It was held from March 1 to March 15, 1993.

The men singles was headlined by world No. 1 Jim Courier, Pete Sampras and Stefan Edberg. Other top seeds were Michael Chang, Petr Korda, Goran Ivanišević, Andre Agassi and Michael Stich.

The women's draw featured. Other top seeds present were.

Notable stories
Stefan Edberg and Andre Agassi lost unexpectedly in the second round to wildcard Richey Reneberg and Marc Rosset respectively. 
Wayne Ferreira managed to make his first impression in a major tournament, reaching the final.

Finals

Men's singles

 Jim Courier defeated  Wayne Ferreira 6–3, 6–3, 6–1
It was Jim Courier's 3rd title of the year and his 12th overall. It was his 1st Masters title of the year and his 4th overall. It was also his 2nd title at the event after winning in 1991.

Women's singles

 Mary Joe Fernández defeated  Amanda Coetzer 3–6, 6–1, 7–6(8–6)
It was Mary Joe Fernadez 1st title of the year and her 3rd overall.

Men's doubles

 Guy Forget /  Henri Leconte defeated  Luke Jensen /  Scott Melville 6–4, 7–5

Women's doubles

 Rennae Stubbs /  Helena Suková defeated  Ann Grossman /  Patricia Hy 6–3, 6–4

References

External links
 
 Association of Tennis Professionals (ATP) tournament profile

 
1993 Newsweek Champions Cup and the Matrix Essentials Evert Cup
Newsweek Champions Cup and the Matrix Essentials Evert Cup
Matrix Essentials Evert Cup
Newsweek Champions Cup and the Matrix Essentials Evert Cup
Newsweek Champions Cup and the Matrix Essentials Evert Cup
Newsweek Champions Cup And The Matrix Essentials Evert Cup